Eureka Historic District may refer to:

 Eureka Historic District (Eureka, Nevada), listed on the NRHP in Nevada
 Eureka Historic District (Eureka, Utah), listed on the NRHP in Utah
 Eureka Springs Historic District, Eureka Springs, Arkansas, listed on the NRHP in Arkansas
 Old Town Eureka, formerly known as Eureka Historic District (Eureka, California), listed on the NRHP in California